Bhalwani is a village in Parner taluka in Ahmednagar district of state of Maharashtra, India.

Religion
The majority of the population in the village is Hindu.

Economy
The majority of the population has farming as their primary occupation. Around 70% population of Bhalwani is with unique surname "Rohokale".
Bhalawani is located on Nagar-Kalyan National highway, 20 km away from the District place Ahmednagar. Bhalwani Village is located on the bank of Kapri river. There is a MIDC with D+ zone, having around 30 plus medium scale manufacturing companies.

See also
 Parner taluka
 Villages in Parner taluka

References

Villages in Parner taluka
Villages in Ahmednagar district